Sibusiso Owen Nkumane  (born 10 August 1975) is a South African former rugby union player and television commentator.

Career

Nkumane toured with Springboks to Britain and Ireland in 1998. He did not play in any of the test matches but did play in four tour matches.

See also
 List of South Africa national rugby union players – Springbok no. 679

References

1975 births
Living people
South African rugby union players
South Africa international rugby union players
Golden Lions players
Rugby union players from Johannesburg
Rugby union hookers